Infotheca: Journal for Digital Humanities is a multidisciplinary open-access journal, which has been publishing original papers since 2000. It is published biannually.

About 
Infotheca is a multidisciplinary journal that publishes original papers in digital humanities, as well as papers in which mathematical models, algorithms, procedures, standards and informatics applications intended for humanities research are used and improved. All papers in the same edition are published on Open Access and are available in Serbian and English. In addition to the printed edition, an online edition is available. Registration of papers is carried out through an open journal system.

History 

Infotheca Journal was first published in September 2000. The scientific journal originates from the Information Serbian Academic Library Association. It was originally called Infotheca: Journal for Informatics and Librarianship (ISSN 0354-6462). The Journal for Librarianship and Informatics published papers both in Serbian and English. In 2014, the journal was renamed Infotheca: Journal for Digital Humanities. All of its scientific and professional papers have DOI numbers.

Editors 
 2000-2010: Prof. Dr. Dušan Surla.
 2010-Present: Prof. Dr. Cvetana Krstev.

Publishers 
 2013: Serbian Academic Library Association
 2014-present: University of Belgrade Faculty of Philology; Serbian Academic Library Association and University Library Svetozar Marković

Topics 
 Creation, maintenance and standardization of digital resources for the Humanities.
 Humanities research supported by the digital media and information technology.
 Computer methods and Computer Applications in linguistic, literary, culturological and Historical Research.
 Development of methods, resources and tools for Natural language processing.
 Development of methods, standards and procedures for Information Representation and Information retrieval.
 Information technologies in Librarianship, Museology and Archival science and their influence on scientific Information systems and scientific communication.
 Digital art, architecture, movies, theatre and the new media.
 Impact of E-learning and other forms of teaching and learning supported by educational information technologies.
 Changes in science, research and publishing under the influence of new technologies.
 The place of the Digital humanities at the University and the development of Digital humanities curricula.

Open access 

Since 2004, Infotheca has had an online edition (ISSN: 2217-9461). Infotheca is an open access journal which means that its contents are available free of charge to the users or their institutions. Users are allowed to read, download, copy, distribute, print, search, or link to the full texts of the articles in this journal, without asking prior permission. Infotheca is the copyright holder of published articles, under the conditions defined in Creative Commons license (CC BY-NC-ND 3.0).

Indexing 
 EBSCO – Academic Search Complete
 EBSCO – Library, Information Science & Technology Abstracts

References

External link

Multidisciplinary humanities journals
Biannual journals